Corang River is a perennial river of the Shoalhaven catchment located in the Southern Tablelands region of New South Wales, Australia.

Location and features
Corang River rises on the western slopes of the Budawang Range and flows generally northwest, joined by five minor tributaries, before reaching its confluence with the Shoalhaven River at Cardies Point, north of Corang, descending  over its  course.

See also

List of rivers of New South Wales (A–K)
Rivers of New South Wales

References

Rivers of New South Wales
Southern Tablelands
Shoalhaven River